KNEP (channel 4) is a television station in Sidney, Nebraska, United States, serving Scottsbluff and the Nebraska Panhandle as an affiliate of NBC. It is owned by Gray Television alongside Cheyenne, Wyoming–licensed dual CBS/CW+ affiliate KGWN-TV (channel 5). KNEP's studios are located on 1st Avenue in Scottsbluff, and its transmitter is located in Angora, Nebraska.

Although identifying as a separate station in its own right, KNEP is considered a semi-satellite of KNOP-TV (channel 2) in North Platte.

History
The station signed on for the first time on March 5, 1958, as KDUH-TV, broadcasting from Hay Springs, Nebraska. The station was owned by Helen Duhamel, whose last name formed the basis of the callsign. It was a semi-satellite of the original KOTA-TV in Rapid City (license now held by KHME). Like its parent, it carried programming from all four major networks, but was a primary CBS affiliate.

In 1965, in tandem with its parent, KDUH took on an unusual joint primary affiliation with CBS and ABC, slightly favoring CBS. This caused a good deal of confusion for viewers in the Nebraska Panhandle, since future sister station KSTF, which had signed on three years earlier in 1955, also held a joint primary affiliation with CBS and ABC, slightly favoring ABC. It was not unheard of for both stations to air the same program at the same time. However, in 1970, again in tandem with its parent, KDUH became a joint primary affiliate of ABC and NBC. This came after NBC finally lost patience with its longtime affiliate in the Black Hills, KRSD-TV (channel 7), whose signal had deteriorated to the point of unacceptability.

KRSD would be forced off the air in 1976, replaced by a new station on channel 7, KEVN-TV (license now held by the present KOTA-TV). That station took all ABC programming, resulting in KOTA and KDUH becoming primary NBC affiliates with a secondary CBS affiliation. KDUH lost CBS in 1981 after KELO-TV in Sioux Falls signed on a low-powered repeater in Rapid City, and became a sole full-time NBC affiliate in 1981 before swapping affiliations to ABC in 1984.

Also in 1981, operations were moved from Hay Springs to Scottsbluff. In 1988, KDUH consolidated its operations at KOTA-TV.

On September 24, 2002, the station's mast in Hemingford, which was built in the 1960s, collapsed during an installation of a digital transmitter. Two workers were killed and other three were injured. A new tower was located in Angora was built in 2003 as a replacement the collapsed transmitter. The full signal was restored on September 19, 2003. During the construction of the tower, KDUH reached viewers on cable systems in the area and Duhamel-owned translators K02NT in Scottsbluff, and K02NY in Chadron.

Bill Duhamel announced on October 31, 2013, that KOTA-TV and its satellites (including KDUH-TV) would be sold to Schurz Communications' subsidiary Rushmore Media Company, pending FCC approval. The FCC granted the sale on March 31, 2014; and it was completed on April 28, 2014.

On September 14, 2015, Schurz announced that it would exit broadcasting and sell its television and radio stations, including KDUH-TV, to Gray Television for $442.5 million. In its original filing with the FCC, Gray said that KDUH would be converted to a satellite of KNOP-TV, a Gray-owned NBC affiliate in North Platte. In a subsequent filing with the FCC, Gray requested change the KDUH-TV call letters to KNEP following its conversion to a KNOP-TV satellite. It also sought to change KDUH/KNEP's city of license to Sidney. By changing its city of license, KNEP was now officially reckoned as part of the Denver market rather than the Cheyenne–Scottsbluff market, eliminating an ownership conflict with KSTF in Scottsbluff, a semi-satellite of KGWN-TV in Cheyenne, Wyoming. The FCC does not allow one company to own two of the four highest-rated stations in the market. Additionally, the Cheyenne–Scottsbluff market had only five full-power stations (KGWN and KSTF are counted as one station for ratings and regulatory purposes), which was three stations too few to legally permit a duopoly in any case.

The sale was approved by the FCC on February 12, 2016, and was completed on February 16. The FCC approved the change of station's city of license on May 16, making KDUH/KNEP a Denver DMA station. For all intents and purposes, however, it remained a de facto Scottsbluff station.

On May 5, 2016, the station officially became the NBC affiliate for the Nebraska Panhandle. Despite officially becoming a semi-satellite of KNOP-TV, the station formerly aired ABC programming from KOTA on channel 4.1 until 2020, when it was replaced with a simulcast of Fox programming from Rapid City-licensed KEVN-LD until 2022; initially, "NBC Nebraska Scottsbluff" was aired on channel 2.1. , NBC programming is seen on channel 4.1.

Newscasts
KNEP presently broadcasts 8½ hours of locally produced newscasts each week (with 1½ hours each weekday and a half-hour each on Saturdays and Sundays).

As KDUH, the station produced full-length newscasts focused on the Nebraska Panhandle for years. However, due to cutbacks in later years, KDUH's newscasts were reduced to inserts in KOTA's weeknight newscasts with a few personalities locally based in Scottsbluff.

On May 5, 2016, KNEP's full-length localized newscasts in Scottsbluff were reinstated, upon the launch of NBC Nebraska Scottsbluff.

Technical information

Subchannel

Analog-to-digital conversion
KNEP (as KDUH-TV) shut down its analog signal, over VHF channel 4, on February 17, 2009, the original target date in which full-power television stations in the United States were to transition from analog to digital broadcasts under federal mandate (which was later pushed back to June 12). The station's digital signal remained on its pre-transition VHF channel 7. Through the use of PSIP, digital television receivers display the station's virtual channel as its former VHF analog channel 4.

References

External links

KOTA Territory

Television channels and stations established in 1958
1958 establishments in Nebraska
ABC network affiliates
NBC network affiliates
Gray Television
Television stations in Nebraska